The Reid Rambler, later known under the Curtiss-Reid brand after Reid was purchased by Curtiss, was a biplane trainer/sport aircraft built in Canada in the early 1930s and used in small numbers as a trainer aircraft by the Royal Canadian Air Force.

Design and development
In 1928, Wilfrid T. Reid set up his own company in Montreal after working as an engineer for Canadian Vickers. His first design was a light aircraft that was intended to exploit a Canadian government programme to support the development of flying clubs. The Reid Rambler was primarily intended to be a training aircraft. The Rambler was a largely conventional sesquiplane design with wings braced with Warren trusses and which could be folded backwards for transport or storage. The fuselage was of fabric-covered steel tube construction and the pilot and a single passenger sat in tandem, open cockpits.

The prototype (registration G-CAVO) was first flown at the Cartierville Airport on 23 September 1928 by Martin Berlyn. The test flight was nearly a disaster because the ailerons seized, leaving Berlyn with a dangerous approach and landing. A modification of the aileron control linkage rectified the problem. The Rambler continued to be developed, and in 1931, an improved version, the Rambler III, was flown with the more powerful Gipsy III engine. John C. Webster flew the MK III prototype in the British King's Cup Race that year.

Operational history
In December 1928, the Curtiss Aeroplane & Motor Company purchased the Reid Aircraft Company and renamed it The Curtiss-Reid Aircraft Company. The new firm assumed control of the existing Rambler project and established a production line. A number of alterations were made to the production series including replacing the original ailerons with Frise-style ailerons, introducing an unbalanced rudder along with changes to the engine cowling, exhaust system and tailskid, and adding a head rest.

Although it was intended principally for civilian use, the Royal Canadian Air Force (RCAF) evaluated the aircraft as a basic training aircraft. Although the RCAF employed many other ab-initio aircraft including the ubiquitous de Havilland Moth, senior military staff elected to purchase a small number of the Ramblers.

Curtiss-Reid Ramblers enjoyed a relatively productive and lengthy career both in civilian and military use lasting well into the Second World War era.

Variants
Data from:Canadian aircraft since 1909
Rambler Mk.I Powered by an  de Havilland Gipsy I
Rambler Mk.II Powered by a  Cirrus Hermes II
Rambler Mk.III Powered by a  de Havilland Gipsy III

Specifications (Rambler Mk.I)

References

Further reading

External links

 rcaf.com Curtiss-Reid Rambler
 Canadian Aviation Heritage Centre - Curtiss-Reid Rambler
 Flightglobal Archive  - Curtiss-Reid Rambler

Rambler
Sesquiplanes
Single-engined tractor aircraft
1920s Canadian sport aircraft
Aircraft first flown in 1928